Frieda Hunziker (1908-1966) was a Dutch painter.

Biography 
Hunziker was born on 17 October 1908 in Amsterdam.

Hunziker's work was included in the 1939 exhibition and sale Onze Kunst van Heden (Our Art of Today) at the Rijksmuseum in Amsterdam. She also exhibited at the 1945 exhibition Kunst in Vrijheid (Art in Freedom) at the Rijksmuseum. She exhibited regularly at the Stedelijk Museum Amsterdam. Hunziker was one of the original members of the group Vrije Beelden (Free Images).

Hunziker died on 9 September 1966 in Amsterdam.

References

External links 
images of Hunziker's work on ArtNet

1908 births
1966 deaths
Painters from Amsterdam
20th-century Dutch women artists
Dutch painters